Yunyou (19 August 1680 – 18 May 1730) was an imperial prince of the Qing dynasty and a son of the Kangxi Emperor. In 1709, Yunyou was granted the title "Prince Chun of the Second Rank" by his father. He was promoted to "Prince Chun of the First Rank" in 1723.

The Prince Chun peerage was not awarded "iron-cap" status. This meant that each successive bearer of the title would normally start off with a title downgraded by one rank. Hongjing, Yunyou's sixth son, held the title of Prince Chun of the Second Rank from 1730 to 1777.

Yunyou was born in the 19th year of Kangxi reign, with a disability in his right leg. His birth mother was Consort Cheng of Daigiya clan, but he was raised by Consort Hui of Yehe Nara clan.

Family 
Primary Consort

 Primary consort, of the Hada Nara clan (嫡福晉 哈達那拉氏)
 Third daughter (19 November 1699 – July/August 1702)
 Princess of the Third Rank (郡主; 19 September 1701 – 30 December 1729), fifth daughter
 Married Baojin (保进) of the Wendu (温度) clan in 1718

Secondary Consort

 Secondary consort, of the Nara clan (側福晉 納喇氏)
 Princess of the Third daughter (郡主; 17 December 1696 – December 1720 or January 1721), first daughter
 Married Tuizhong (推忠/推忠) of the Naiman Borjigin in 1714
 Hongshu (弘曙; 21 January 1698 – 18 May 1738), Prince Chun of the First Rank, first son
 Princess of the Third Rank (郡主; 6 October 1699 – 25 January 1733), second daughter
 Married Dorji Lashi (多尔济拉氏) of the Aohandu clan in 1717
 Hongzhuo, General of the Second Rank (輔國將軍 弘晫; 26 November 1700 – 20 October 1743), second son
 Hongxin (弘昕; 3 June 1702 – 10 September 1712), fourth son

 Secondary consort, of the Barda clan (側福晉 巴爾達氏)
 Hongjing (淳慎郡王 弘暻; 24 August 1711 – 15 August 1777), Prince Chunshen of the Second Rank, sixth son

Concubine

 Mistress, of the Li clan (李佳氏)
 Fourth daughter (24 January 1701 – June/July 1709)
 Fifth son (11 June 1705 – 19 August 1709)
 Princess of the Third Rank (郡主; 28 November 1710 – 18 October 1742), seventh daughter
 Married Sebotengduo'erji (色卜騰多爾濟) of the Khorchin Borjigin clan in 1731

 Mistress, of the Irgen Gioro clan (伊尔根觉罗氏)
 Third son (31 May 1702 – 8 April 1703)
 Sixth daughter (30 June 1709 – April/May 1710)

 Mistress, of the Fuca clan (富察氏)
 Princess of the Fourth Rank (3 September 1726 – 11 November 1745), ninth daughter
 Married Huturingga of the Kharchin Ulanghaijimot clan in 1741
 Tenth daughter (14 December 1728 – 1730)

 Mistress, of the Chen clan (陳氏)
 Hongtai (弘泰; 22 July 1720 – 28 July 1757), General of the Third Rank, seventh son
 Eight daughter (21 November 1720 – July 1723)

Ancestry

See also
Royal and noble ranks of the Qing dynasty
Imperial Chinese harem system
Prince Chun

References

 

Qing dynasty princely peerages
Peerages of the Bordered White Banner
1680 births
1730 deaths
Qing dynasty imperial princes
Kangxi Emperor's sons